The Next Voice You Hear... is a 1950 drama starring James Whitmore and Nancy Davis. It was based on a short story of the same name by George Sumner Albee.   An exhaustive description of the making of the film is the subject of producer Dore Schary's book "Case History of a Movie."

Plot
The voice of God is heard on the radio, preempting all programming throughout the world and causing widespread hope and alarm. The story is told through Joe and Nancy Smith, a typical American couple, and the positive and negative reactions of other people.

The six messages (one for each day, Tuesday through Sunday, but "on the seventh day He rested.") that God speaks on the radio are read aloud, for the benefit of the film audience, by different characters in the film. The voice of God is never heard.

Cast
 James Whitmore as Joe Smith
 Nancy Davis as Mary Smith
 Gary Gray as Johnny Smith
 Lillian Bronson as Aunt Ethel
 Art Smith as Fred Brannan
 Tom D'Andrea as Harry "Hap" Magee
 Jeff Corey as Freddie Dibson

Reception
The New York Times review called the film "a compound of humor, sentiment and romance—and that element of mysticism which the average person can seldom resist." The reviewer praised the performances of Whitmore, Davis and Gray, who played their young son, but criticized the film's "smug and easy clichés that are used to propel the plot."

Variety called the film an "unusual picture experience" that was "beautifully handled in the understanding writing, direction and playing."

Box office
According to MGM records, the film earned $668,000 in the U.S. and Canada and $120,000 overseas, resulting in a profit to the studio of $367,000.

Music 
The film's score was composed by David Raksin and conducted by Raksin and Johnny Green. The hymn-like theme used for the main and end titles would later be published as "Hasten the Day", with lyrics by Norman Corwin.

Surviving portions of Raksin's score, excluding some source music, were released on compact disc in 2009 on the Film Score Monthly label.

References

External links 
 
 
 
 
 A Case History of a Movie at Internet Archive

1950 films
1950s fantasy drama films
American black-and-white films
American fantasy drama films
1950s English-language films
Films about radio
Films about religion
Films based on short fiction
Films directed by William A. Wellman
Films scored by David Raksin
Films set in Los Angeles
Metro-Goldwyn-Mayer films
1950s American films